William Von Barnekow (born 12 November 2002) is a Swedish professional ice hockey forward. He is currently playing with the Malmö Redhawks of the SHL.

He is drafted by the Buffalo Sabres.

Career statistics

References

External links

2002 births
Living people
Malmö Redhawks players
Swedish ice hockey centres
Sportspeople from Malmö